Roksana Zasina (born 21 August 1988) is a Polish freestyle wrestler. At the 2017 World Wrestling Championships held in Paris, France, she won one of the bronze medals in the women's freestyle 53 kg event. She represented Poland at the 2020 Summer Olympics in Tokyo, Japan.

Career 

She competed in the women's freestyle 51 kg event at the 2010 World Wrestling Championships held in Moscow, Russia. She lost her bronze medal match against Sofia Mattsson of Sweden.

In 2015, she represented Poland at the European Games held in Baku, Azerbaijan and she won the silver medal in the 53 kg event. In 2020, she won the silver medal in the women's 53 kg event at the Individual Wrestling World Cup held in Belgrade, Serbia.

In 2021, she competed in the 55 kg event at the World Wrestling Championships held in Oslo, Norway. She also competed in the 55 kg event at the 2022 World Wrestling Championships held in Belgrade, Serbia.

Achievements

References

External links 

 

Living people
1988 births
Sportspeople from Łódź
Polish female sport wrestlers
European Wrestling Championships medalists
World Wrestling Championships medalists
European Games silver medalists for Poland
Wrestlers at the 2015 European Games
European Games medalists in wrestling
Wrestlers at the 2020 Summer Olympics
Olympic wrestlers of Poland
21st-century Polish women